Alarm fatigue or alert fatigue describes how busy workers (in the case of health care, clinicians) become desensitized to safety alerts, and as a result ignore or fail to respond appropriately to such warnings.  Alarm fatigue occurs in many fields, including construction and mining (where backup alarms sound so frequently that they often become senseless background noise), healthcare (where electronic monitors tracking clinical information such as vital signs and blood glucose sound alarms so frequently, and often for such minor reasons, that they lose the urgency and attention-grabbing power which they are intended to have), and the nuclear power field. Like crying wolf, such false alarms rob the critical alarms of the importance they deserve.  Alarm management and policy are critical to prevent alarm fatigue.

Healthcare 
The constant sounds of alarms and noises from blood pressure machines, ventilators and heart monitors causes a "tuning out" of the sounds due to the brain adjusting to stimulation. This issue is present in hospitals, in home care providers, nursing homes and other medical facilities alike. The US Food and Drug Administration cataloged 566 deaths from ignored alarms in the period 2005-2008. The United States-based Joint Commission's sentinel event reports 80 alarm-related deaths and 13 alarm-related serious injuries over the course of a few years. On April 18, 2013, the Joint Commission issued a sentinel event alert that highlighted the widespread problem of alarm fatigue in hospitals. Their recommendations included establishing guidelines to tailor alarm settings, training all members of the clinical team on safe use of alarms, and sharing information about alarm-related incidents. This alert resulted in designation in 2014 of clinical alarm system safety as a National Patient Safety Goal and it remains a goal in 2017.  This Goal will force hospitals to establish alarm safety as a priority, identify the most important alarms, and establish policies to manage alarms by January 2016. ECRI Institute has listed alarms on its "Top Ten Hazards List" since 2007; in 2014, alarms were listed as the number one hazard.

Unintended outcomes of alarms
The large number of alarms, especially of false alarms, has led to several unintended outcomes.  Some consequences are disruption in patient care, desensitization to alarms, anxiety in hospital staff and patients, sleep deprivation and depressed immune systems, misuse of monitor equipment including "work-arounds" such as turning down alarm volumes or adjusting device settings, and missed critical events. Some additional outcomes include workload increase, interference with communication, wasted time, patient dissatisfaction, and unnecessary investigations, referrals, or treatments.

Solutions
There are many solutions proposed to reduce alarm fatigue in healthcare settings:

 Change alarm sounds to be softer and friendlier in order to improve identification of alarms by sound alone. Another recommendation is for clinicians to adjust the parameters and delays to alarms to match the patient's traits and status. However, this directly trades sensitivity for specificity.
 Use centralized alarms. In this approach, alarms don't fire at the bedside, but fire at a central monitoring station where a trained healthcare provider evaluates each alarm and alerts the bedside clinician if they should intervene or evaluate the patient.
 Adjust alarm algorithms. Currently, the alarm systems are very sensitive but not specific. This leads to a large amount of false alarms. The algorithms used can be adjusted to balance between sensitivity and specificity to limit the number of false alarms and still detect true deterioration.

Child abduction
The amber alert system used in countries such as the United States and Canada to notify the public of a child abduction has been theorized as being susceptible to alarm fatigue. A 2018 abduction in Thunder Bay resulted in an amber alert being sent to cell phones as far away as Ottawa, some 15 hours' drive from Thunder Bay, followed one hour later by a second alert which notified individuals that the first alert had been resolved. A similar double alert occurred on a single night in February 2019, leading to concerns over alert fatigue.

Public transport
In the New York City Subway, the Metropolitan Transportation Authority installed sirens in 2006 to discourage subway users from using emergency exits to evade fares; the sirens had little effect other than irritating passengers and were removed in 2015.

Alarm fatigue has sometimes contributed to public transport disasters such as the 2009 train collision in Washington, DC, caused by a faulty track circuit which failed to detect the presence of a stopped train. Though the automatic train control system generated alerts notifying train dispatchers to the presence of such faulty circuits, the rate of such alerts was about 8,000 per week. An investigation by the US National Transportation Safety Board concluded that "the extremely high incidence of track-circuit alarms would have thoroughly desensitized [the dispatchers]".

Weather
Some people think the large number of deaths from Hurricane Ida in New York and New Jersey may have been the result of too many warnings. Since 2012, weather alerts have been sent out to cell phones, but in 2020, federal officials set up a three-tier system so people would get this warning for the most serious situations.

See also
Alarm management
Compassion fatigue
Normalization of deviance
Semantic satiation

References 

Security technology
Alarms
Warning systems
Safety